Federico Ricci (22 October 1809 – 10 December 1877), was an Italian composer, particularly of operas. Born in Naples, he was the younger brother of Luigi Ricci, with whom he collaborated on several works.

Federico studied at Naples as had his brother.  His first big success was with La prigione di Edimburgo, one of his best serious works. He stayed with serious subjects for several years, and of these Corrado d'Altamura was a particular success. However, his last collaboration with his brother, a comedy called Crispino e la comare, was hailed as the masterpiece of both composers, so Federico devoted himself thereafter entirely to comedy.

After another success closely followed by a major flop in Vienna, Federico took an official job teaching in St Petersburg and for 16 years he wrote no operas. In 1869 he moved to Paris, and there Une folie à Rome ran for 77 nights; other French comedies of his — mainly revisions of his own and his brother's earlier works — found some success. He also contributed the Recordare Jesu in the Sequentia to the Messa per Rossini. In 1870 for Cremona he created a pastiche, La vergine di Kermo, containing music by Pedrotti, Cagnoni, Ponchielli, Pacini, Rossi, and Mazzucato.

Although he did not have his brother's energy, Federico's scores are judged by some to be more skilfully written than Luigi's: for example, it has been said that La prigione di Edimburgo shows a sensitivity towards its subject (from Sir Walter Scott's The Heart of Midlothian) that is rare among Italian operas of the period.  He died in Conegliano.  His nephew Luigi Ricci-Stolz, also called Luigino (1852–1906), was also a composer.

Operas 

1835: Il colonello (also as La donna colonello) (with his brother Luigi Ricci)
1835: Monsieur de Chalumeaux
1836:  (with his brother Luigi Ricci) 
1838: La prigione di Edimburgo (Trieste, 18 March)
1839: Un duello sotto Richelieu
1841: Luigi Rolla e Michelangelo (Florence, 30 March)
1841: Corrado d'Altamura (La Scala, Milan, 16 November)
1842: Vallombra
1845: Isabella de'Medici
1846: Estella di Murcia 
1846: L'amante di richiamo (with his brother Luigi) 
1847: Griselda 
1850: Crispino e la comare, ossia Il medico e la morte (with his brother Luigi) (Venice San Benedetto, 28 February 1850, rev. 1869: as Le docteur Crispin)
1850: I due ritratti
1852: Il marito e l'amante (rev. 1872: as Une fête à Venise)
1853: Il paniere d 'amore
1869: Une folie à Rome (Paris)
1870: La vergine di Kermo (Cremona) 
1872: Le docteur Rose, ou La dogaresse
1876: Don Quichotte (incomplete)

References
Notes

Sources
Budden, Julian (1998), "Ricci, Federico", in Stanley Sadie (ed.), The New Grove Dictionary of Opera, Vol. Three, pp. 1309–1310.  London: Macmillan Publishers, Inc.   
Budden, Julian (1998), "Ricci, Luigi", in Stanley Sadie (ed.), The New Grove Dictionary of Opera, Vol. Three, pp. 1310–1311.  London: Macmillan Publishers, Inc.   
Rose, Michael (2001), "Ricci, Federico", in Holden, Amanda (ed.), The New Penguin Opera Guide, New York: Penguin Putnam, p. 744. 
Rose, Michael (2001), "Ricci, Luigi", in Amanda Holden (ed.), The New Penguin Opera Guide, New York: Penguin Putnam, p. 745. 

1809 births
1877 deaths
Italian opera composers
Male opera composers
Musicians from Naples
Italian classical composers
Italian male classical composers
Italian expatriates in Russia
19th-century classical composers
19th-century Italian composers
19th-century Italian male musicians